Ek Tha Hero is a 2016 Hindi film featuring Ayush Mahesh Khedekar and Amita Pathak in the lead roles. Directed by Yogesh Pagare.

Cast
 Ayush Mahesh Khedekar as Jignesh
 Amita Pathak as Janki
 Ashwini Kalsekar as Gomti
 Asrani as Gafoor Chacha
 Darshan Jariwala as Bade Babuji
 Rohit

Music

The film has 4 music tracks. "Cycle Meri Joike" is a fun song by Sandeep Batraa, Jui Parth Thakkar, Arpita Mukherjee. "Sapney" is a melodious track by Arpita Mukherjee. Divya Kumar & Sandeep Batra have lent their voices for "Aatish Hai Tu". A devotional track in the form of "Ganpati Bappa" by Sandeep Batraa, Monty Sharma, Neha Vaishnav add a rustic flavour to the album. Monty Sharma & Sandeep Batraa composed the music and Sunil Sirvaiya and Tanveer Ghazi are the lyricists. while Sunil Sirvaiya and Tanveer Ghazi are the lyricists.

References

External links
 
 http://www.bollywoodhungama.com/moviemicro/cast/id/554238

2016 films
2010s Hindi-language films